Shrivardhan Fort is one of the two hill forts that constitute the Rajmachi fortification, the other being Manaranjan Fort. It is located in Rajmachi village which 8.5 km from Lonavala in the Sahyadris mountain range. At 900 m(3000 feet) above sea level it was the taller of the two peaks and was named after Shrivardhan Ganpatrao Patwardhan. Other than a rampart there is no visible construction. It was probably used at a watchtower for the Sahyadri region. There are two water tanks at the top of the hill but one of them has an iron pillar in it.

How to reach 
There are two ways to reach the fort
1) Lonavla Tungarli way. It is an easy path which takes about 1 hour to reach the base village Udhewadi
2) Karjat-kondivade way. It requires a trekking up the hill for 2-hour. This route passes through dense forest area through the Ulhas river valley.

References

See also 
 List of forts in Maharashtra
 List of forts in India
 Shivaji
 List of Maratha dynasties and states
 Maratha War of Independence
 Battles involving the Maratha Empire
 Maratha Army
 Maratha titles
 Military history of India
 List of people involved in the Maratha Empire
 Kondana Caves

Buildings and structures of the Maratha Empire
Forts in Pune district
16th-century forts in India
Caves of Maharashtra
Tourist attractions in Pune district
Former populated places in India
Hiking trails in India

Hiking